Stephen Richard Berger (born May 20, 1973) is an American retired professional mixed martial artist who competed in the Welterweight division. Berger is probably best known for fighting in the UFC, most notably participating in the first mixed martial arts fight aired on US cable television against Robbie Lawler at UFC 37.5.

Background
Berger was born and raised in St. Louis, Missouri. According to him, he had serious anxiety that he tried to relieve by getting into fights in his youth. Berger wrestled in high school, and started boxing at the age of 17. After having boxing for a few years, Berger picked up judo and Brazilian jiu-jitsu as well.

Personal life
Berger and his wife have a son.

Mixed martial arts record

|-
| Loss
| align=center| 20–23–2 (2)
| Scott Cleve
| Submission (guillotine choke)
| CC 37 - Cage Championships 37
| 
| align=center| 1
| align=center| 1:02
| Washington, Missouri, United States
| 
|-
| Loss
| align=center| 20–22–2 (2)
| Chris Tickle
| TKO (punches)
| PCL - Cage Madness
| 
| align=center| 2
| align=center| 0:56
| Glen Carbon, Illinois, United States
| 
|-
| Loss
| align=center| 20–21–2 (2)
| Ferrid Kheder
| TKO (punches)
| Mixed Fight League 3
| 
| align=center| 2
| align=center| 1:26
| Montreal, Quebec, Canada
| 
|-
| Win
| align=center| 20–20–2 (2)
| Sal Woods
| Submission (guillotine choke)
| Premier Combat League 1: Bad Intentions
| 
| align=center| 3
| align=center| 1:13
| Glen Carbon, Illinois, United States
| 
|-
| Loss
| align=center| 19–20–2 (2)
| Waylon Lowe
| KO (punches)
| KOTC: Bad Boys II
| 
| align=center| 1
| align=center| 2:18
| Detroit, Michigan, United States
| 
|-
| Win
| align=center| 19–19–2 (2)
| Ryan Scheeper
| Submission (arm-triangle choke)
| Take That Promotions: Warriors Collide
| 
| align=center| 1
| align=center| 2:10
| Glen Carbon, Illinois, United States
| 
|-
| Loss
| align=center| 18–19–2 (2)
| Ray Steinbeiss
| Decision (unanimous)
| Evolution MMA
| 
| align=center| 3
| align=center| 5:00
| Phoenix, Arizona, United States
| 
|-
| Loss
| align=center| 18–18–2 (2)
| Eddy Ellis
| Decision (unanimous)
| Strikeforce: At The Dome
| 
| align=center| 3
| align=center| 5:00
| Tacoma, Washington, United States
| 
|-
| Loss
| align=center| 18–17–2 (2)
| Diego Gonzalez
| Decision (unanimous)
| Bodog Fight - Vancouver
| 
| align=center| 3
| align=center| 5:00
| British Columbia, Canada
| 
|-
| Win
| align=center| 18–16–2 (2)
| Piotr Jakaczynski
| Decision (split)
| Bodog Fight - Costa Rica
| 
| align=center| 3
| align=center| 5:00
| Costa Rica
| 
|-
| Loss
| align=center| 17–16–2 (2)
| Jorge Masvidal
| Decision (unanimous)
| Bodog Fight - St. Petersburg
| 
| align=center| 3
| align=center| 5:00
| St. Petersburg, Russia
| 
|-
| Loss
| align=center| 17–15–2 (2)
| Jake Shields
| TKO (punches)
| FCP: Malice at Cow Palace
| 
| align=center| 2
| align=center| 1:36
| Cow Palace, San Francisco, CA.
| 
|-
| Loss
| align=center| 17–14–2 (2)
| Victor Moreno
| TKO (doctor stoppage)
| Diesel Fighting Championships 1
| 
| align=center| 1
| align=center| 3:00
| Texas, United States
| 
|-
| Win
| align=center| 17–13–2 (2)
| Mark Long
| TKO (punches)
| TFC 4: Memorial Mayhem
| 
| align=center| 1
| align=center| 1:38
| Kansas, United States
| 
|-
| Loss
| align=center| 16–13–2 (2)
| Nuri Shakur
| Decision (unanimous)
| APEX: Undisputed
| 
| align=center| 3
| align=center| 5:00
| Montreal, Quebec, Canada
| 
|-
| Loss
| align=center| 16–12–2 (2)
| Heath Sims
| TKO (cut)
| SF 9: Respect
| 
| align=center| 3
| align=center| 1:23
| Oregon, United States
| 
|-
| Loss
| align=center| 16–11–2 (2)
| Keith Wisniewski
| Decision (unanimous)
| Combat - Do Fighting Challenge 1
| 
| align=center| 3
| align=center| 5:00
| Illinois, United States
| 
|-
| Win
| align=center| 16–10–2 (2)
| Fritz Paul
| Submission (punches)
| APEX: Genesis
| 
| align=center| 1
| align=center| 4:46
| Montreal, Quebec, Canada
| 
|-
| Loss
| align=center| 15–10–2 (2)
| Phil Johns
| Decision
| RSF - Shooto Challenge 2
| 
| align=center| 3
| align=center| 5:00
| Illinois, United States
| 
|-
| Loss
| align=center| 15–9–2 (2)
| Din Thomas
| Decision (unanimous)
| Absolute Fighting Championships 4
| 
| align=center| 3
| align=center| 5:00
| Florida, United States
| 
|-
| Win
| align=center| 15–8–2 (2)
| Nuri Shakur
| Submission (guillotine choke)
| USMMA 2: Ring of Fury
| 
| align=center| 1
| align=center| 4:59
| Massachusetts, United States
| 
|-
| Loss
| align=center| 14–8–2 (2)
| Robbie Lawler
| TKO (punches)
| UFC 37.5
| 
| align=center| 2
| align=center| 0:27
| Nevada, United States
| 
|-
| NC
| align=center| 14–7–2 (2)
| Benji Radach
| No Contest (Overturned by State Commission)
| UFC 37
| 
| align=center| 1
| align=center| 0:27
| Louisiana, United States
| Radach was declared the winner by TKO at 0:27 of the first round, but the fight was later ruled a No Contest by the Louisiana State Athletic Commission
|-
| Win
| align=center| 14–7–2 (1)
| Pete Spratt
| TKO (cut)
| UA 1: The Genesis
| 
| align=center| 1
| align=center| 2:14
| Indiana, United States
| 
|-
| Loss
| align=center| 13–7–2 (1)
| Chris Brennan
| Decision (unanimous)
| KOTC 11 - Domination
| 
| align=center| 3
| align=center| 5:00
| California, United States
| 
|-
| Win
| align=center| 13–6–2 (1)
| Seichi Ikemoto
| Submission (triangle/armbar)
| Shooto - To The Top 7
| 
| align=center| 3
| align=center| 2:09
| Osaka, Japan
| 
|-
| Loss
| align=center| 12–6–2 (1)
| Tony DeSouza
| Decision (unanimous)
| UFC 31
| 
| align=center| 3
| align=center| 5:00
| New Jersey, United States
|
|-
| Win
| align=center| 12–5–2 (1)
| Nick Cardenez
| Submission (armbar)
| TPA - Tom Proctor's Absolute
| 
| align=center| 1
| align=center| 1:10
| United States
| 
|-
| Loss
| align=center| 11–5–2 (1)
| Karl Schmidt
| TKO (cut)
| Reality Submission Fighting 2
| 
| align=center| 1
| align=center| 22:38
| Belleville, Illinois, United States
| 
|-
| Win
| align=center| 11–4–2 (1)
| Rich Clementi
| Submission (armbar)
| Dangerzone - Insane In Ft. Wayne
| 
| align=center| 1
| align=center| 3:14
| Fort Wayne, Indiana, United States
| 
|-
| Draw
| align=center| 10–4–2 (1)
| Jutaro Nakao
| Draw
| HOOKnSHOOT: Fusion
| 
| align=center| 3
| align=center| 5:00
| Evansville, Indiana, United States
| 
|-
| Win
| align=center| 10–4–1 (1)
| Riley McIlhon
| Submission (armbar)
| rowspan=2|Reality Submission Fighting 1
| rowspan=2|
| align=center| 1
| align=center| 1:12
|rowspan=2| Belleville, Illinois, United States
| 
|-
| Win
| align=center| 9–4–1 (1)
| Shonie Carter
| Submission (rear-naked choke)
| align=center| 1
| align=center| 2:41
| 
|-
| Win
| align=center| 8–4–1 (1)
| Brian Geraghty
| Submission (armbar)
| Submission Fighting Championships 11
| 
| align=center| 1
| align=center| 2:01
| Collinsville, Illinois, United States
| 
|-
| Loss
| align=center| 7–4–1 (1)
| Aaron Riley
| Decision
| HOOKnSHOOT: Triumph
| 
| align=center| 3
| align=center| 5:00
| Evansville, Indiana, United States
| 
|-
| Loss
| align=center| 7–3–1 (1)
| Jason Black
| Decision (split)
| Extreme Challenge 32
| 
| align=center| 1
| align=center| 15:00
| Springfield, Illinois, United States
| 
|-
| Draw
| align=center| 7–2–1 (1)
| Andy Sanders
| Draw
| HOOKnSHOOT - Double Fury 2
| 
| align=center| N/A
| 
| Evansville, Indiana, United States
| 
|-
| Win
| align=center| 7–2 (1)
| Shannon Ritch
| Submission (guillotine)
| Submission Fighting Championships 9
| 
| align=center| 1
| align=center| 1:30
| Belleville, Illinois, United States
| 
|-
| Win
| align=center| 6–2 (1)
| Jason Glabus
| Decision
|rowspan=2| Ironheart Crown 1 - Genesis
|rowspan=2| 
| align=center| 2
| align=center| 2:00
| rowspan=2| Chicago, Illinois, United States
| 
|-
| Win
| align=center| 5–2 (1)
| Shonie Carter
| Decision (split)
| align=center| 2
| align=center| 2:00
| 
|-
| Loss
| align=center| 4–2 (1)
| Ben Harrison
| Decision
| HOOKnSHOOT: Beyond
| 
| align=center| 1
| align=center| 15:00
| 
| 
|-
| Win
| align=center| 4–1 (1)
| James Wade
| Submission (triangle choke)
| Submission Fighting Championships 8
| 
| align=center| 1
| 
| Belleville, Illinois, United States
| 
|-
| Loss
| align=center| 3–1 (1)
| Jeremy Horn
| Decision (unanimous)
| Submission Fighting Championships 5
| 
| align=center| 1
| align=center| 24:00
| Belleville, Illinois, United States
| 
|-
| NC
| align=center| 3–0 (1)
| Greg James
| No Contest
|rowspan=2| UCC - Universal Challenge Championship
|rowspan=2| 
| align=center| 1
| align=center| 0:38
| rowspan=2|
| 
|-
| Win
| align=center| 3–0
| David Beason
| Submission (front choke)
| align=center| 1
| align=center| 8:58
| 
|-
| Win
| align=center| 2–0
| James Wade
| Decision
| Submission Fighting Championships 2
| 
| align=center| N/A
| 
| Collinsville, Illinois, United States
| 
|-
| Win
| align=center| 1–0
| Ryan McBride
| Submission (armbar)
| Submission Fighting Championships 1
| 
| align=center| N/A
| 
| Collinsville, Illinois, United States
|

References

External links

1973 births
Living people
American male mixed martial artists
Mixed martial artists from Missouri
Welterweight mixed martial artists
Mixed martial artists utilizing boxing
Mixed martial artists utilizing wrestling
Mixed martial artists utilizing judo
Mixed martial artists utilizing Brazilian jiu-jitsu
American practitioners of Brazilian jiu-jitsu
Ultimate Fighting Championship male fighters